The Tariff of 1792 was the third of Alexander Hamilton's protective tariffs in the United States (first was the Hamilton tariff of 1789, second was the Tariff of 1790). Hamilton had persuaded the United States Congress to raise duties slightly in 1790, and he persuaded them to raise rates again in 1792, although still not to his satisfaction. Protectionism was one of the fulfillments of Hamilton's Report on Manufactures.

See also

References

External links
  
 
 

1792 in American law
1792 in the United States
2nd United States Congress
United States federal taxation legislation
1792